South Kattali is a No.11 Ward of Chittagong City Corporation and a part of Pahartali Thana.

Size 

Population data 
The total population of South Kattali ward is 93,562 as per 2011 Census. Of these 47,660 are males and 45,902 are females. Total families are 20,613.

Location and boundaries 
Chittagong City Corporation Location of South Kattali Ward in the North-West. It is bounded on the South by 26 No. North Halishahar Ward, on the east by 12 No. Saraipara Ward, on the north by 10 No. North Kattali Ward and on the West by Bay of Bengal.

Geography

Election highlights

References

Chittagong District
Chittagong
Villages in Chittagong District